Empire Cheer was a  cargo ship which was built in 1943 by William Doxford & Sons Ltd, Sunderland. She was built for the Ministry of War Transport (MoWT) and completed in July 1943. After the Second World War she was sold to her managers, Sir William Reardon Smith & Sons Ltd, who renamed her Cornish City. On 8 December 1962 she suffered an engine room fire, after which she was scrapped in March 1963.

Construction
The ship was built by William Doxford & Sons Ltd, Sunderland, as yard number 702. She was launched on 9 March 1943 and completed in July 1943.

Dimensions
She had a gross register tonnage (GRT) of 7,297 and a net register tonnage (NRT) of 4,936. Her deadweight tonnage (DWT) was 10,073.

Engine
The ship was propelled by a 2-stroke Single Cycle Single Action diesel engine, which had three cylinders of  bore by  stroke.

History
Empire Cheer was built for the MoWT. She was placed under the management of Sir W Reardon Smith & Sons Ltd. The United Kingdom Official Number 169115 and the Code Letters BFJJ were allocated. Her port of registry was Sunderland.

Empire Cheer was a member of a number of convoys during the Second World War.

HX 305
Convoy HX 305 departed New York on 25 August 1944 and arrived at Liverpool on 10 September. Empire Cheer was carrying general cargo bound for Methil and London.

MKS 97G
Convoy MKS 97G departed Gibraltar on 25 April 1945 bound for the United Kingdom. Empire Cheer was carrying a cargo of wheat. She was fitted with an anti-torpedo net device.

In 1946, Empire Cheer was sold to Sir W Reardon Smith & Sons Ltd who renamed her Cornish City, the fourth Reardon Smith Line ship to carry that name. She served until 1962. On 8 December, the ship was in port at Aden when a fire broke out in her engine room, killing two of her crew.  Cornish City arrived at Hong Kong for scrapping on 7 March 1963.

References

1943 ships
Ships built on the River Wear
Empire ships
Ministry of War Transport ships
Steamships of the United Kingdom
Merchant ships of the United Kingdom